Seneca County is a county located in the northwestern part of the U.S. state of Ohio. As of the 2020 census, the population was 55,069. Its county seat is Tiffin. The county was created in 1820 and organized in 1824. It is named for the Seneca Indians, the westernmost nation of the Iroquois Confederacy. This people were based in present-day New York but had territory extending into Pennsylvania and Ohio.

Seneca County comprises the Tiffin, OH Micropolitan Statistical Area, which is also included in the Findlay-Tiffin, OH Combined Statistical Area.

History
This area was long occupied by a succession of indigenous peoples. During and after the colonial period, French, British and American fur traders established relations with the historic peoples of the time.

The county was barely inhabited by European Americans until the 1830s, but this period was one of steady migration by settlers from New York and New England. The migration was stimulated by completion of the Erie Canal through New York, which connected the markets by the Great Lakes to the Hudson River and New York City. By 1860 the population of Seneca County had increased to about half the current number of residents. It was developed for agriculture, and grew slowly thereafter.

Toward the end of the 19th century, during the Great Depression, and the post–World War II baby boom, this area had periods of greater population increase. In 1980 the census recorded a population of 61,901; the total has since declined. Since about 2000, the county's population declines by about 100–300 persons annually, mainly due to a migration deficit of about 300 persons annually. This decline is projected to continue in the future.

Geography

Almost 80% of the county's total area is agricultural land. Some 10% is covered by forest. Most of the rest is developed, with some allocated for pastureland.

The terrain of Seneca County is nearly level, gently sloping from about 290 meters ASL in the southeast to about 210 m ASL at the edge of the Great Black Swamp in the northwest. Most of the county's area is located between 230 and 260 m ASL, however. Almost the entire county belongs to the Sandusky River drainage basin; the river bisects the county from north to south slightly west of its middle. Tiffin developed on both sides of the river, which flows north to its mouth at Lake Erie. There is some steeper terrain along the river's course, formed by the occasional ravine of its tributaries.

The Great Lakes moderate temperatures somewhat, but Seneca County has essentially a continental climate. After most of the forests were cleared for agricultural development, the microclimate was disrupted. Winters can be harsh, with plentiful snowfall due to lake-effect snow. Summers are often hot and oppressively humid, bordering on subtropical. The mostly featureless surface does not form any obstacles to the winter winds sweeping south from Canada, resulting in extreme wind chill at times. In a 1906 description, the local climate was described as "rather unhealthful".

Adjacent counties
 Sandusky County (north)
 Huron County (east)
 Crawford County (southeast)
 Wyandot County (southwest)
 Hancock County (west)
 Wood County (northwest)

Demographics

2000 census
As of the census of 2000, there were 58,683 people, 22,292 households, and 15,738 families residing in the county. The population density was 107 people per square mile (41/km2). There were 23,692 housing units at an average density of 43 per square mile (17/km2). The racial makeup of the county was 95.04% White, 1.76% Black or African American, 0.18% Native American, 0.38% Asian, 0.01% Pacific Islander, 1.39% from other races, and 1.25% from two or more races. 3.36% of the population were Hispanic or Latino of any race.

There were 22,292 households, out of which 33.40% had children under the age of 18 living with them, 56.10% were married couples living together, 10.20% had a female householder with no husband present, and 29.40% were non-families. 24.70% of all households were made up of individuals, and 10.60% had someone living alone who was 65 years of age or older. The average household size was 2.56 and the average family size was 3.04.

In the county, the population was spread out, with 26.00% under the age of 18, 10.40% from 18 to 24, 27.20% from 25 to 44, 22.40% from 45 to 64, and 14.10% who were 65 years of age or older. The median age was 36 years. For every 100 females there were 98.00 males. For every 100 females age 18 and over, there were 95.70 males.

The median income for a household in the county was $38,037, and the median income for a family was $44,600. Males had a median income of $32,387 versus $22,383 for females. The per capita income for the county was $17,027. About 6.10% of families and 9.00% of the population were below the poverty line, including 9.60% of those under age 18 and 7.20% of those age 65 or over.

2010 census
As of the 2010 United States Census, there were 56,745 people, 21,774 households, and 14,870 families residing in the county. The racial makeup of the county was 93.7% white, 2.3% black or African American, 0.6% Asian, 0.2% American Indian, 1.3% from other races, and 1.9% from two or more races. Those of Hispanic or Latino origin made up 4.4% of the population. In terms of ancestry, 47.6% were German, 10.4% were Irish, 8.9% were American, and 8.2% were English.

Of the 21,774 households, 31.4% had children under the age of 18 living with them, 51.6% were married couples living together, 11.3% had a female householder with no husband present, 31.7% were non-families, and 26.3% of all households were made up of individuals. The average household size was 2.49 and the average family size was 2.97. The median age was 38.8 years.

The median income for a household in the county was $42,573 and the median income for a family was $51,216. Males had a median income of $39,494 versus $30,286 for females. The per capita income for the county was $20,976. About 8.7% of families and 11.9% of the population were below the poverty line, including 17.9% of those under age 18 and 8.3% of those age 65 or over.

Politics
Prior to 1936, Seneca County had supported Democrats in presidential elections, supporting Republican candidates only four times from 1856 to 1932. But starting with the 1936 election, it has become a Republican stronghold in presidential elections. Its support for Democrats Lyndon B. Johnson in 1964 and Bill Clinton in 1996 were the exceptions.

|}

Government and politics

County officials

Transportation

Major highways
   U.S. Route 23
   U.S. Route 224

Other highways

   State Route 4
   State Route 12
   State Route 18
   State Route 19
   State Route 53
   State Route 67
   State Route 100
   State Route 101
   State Route 162
   State Route 228
   State Route 231
   State Route 587
   State Route 590
   State Route 635
   State Route 778

Airports
 Bandit Field Airdrome
 Fostoria Metropolitan Airport
 Seneca County Airport
 Weiker Airport

Communities

Cities
 Bellevue (partly)
 Fostoria (partly)
 Tiffin (county seat)

Villages
 Attica
 Bettsville
 Bloomville
 Green Springs (partly)
 New Riegel
 Republic

Townships

 Adams
 Big Spring
 Bloom
 Clinton
 Eden
 Hopewell
 Jackson
 Liberty
 Loudon
 Pleasant
 Reed
 Scipio
 Seneca
 Thompson
 Venice

https://web.archive.org/web/20160715023447/http://www.ohiotownships.org/township-websites

Census-designated places
 Bascom
 Flat Rock
 Fort Seneca
 Kansas
 McCutchenville
 Melmore
 Old Fort

Unincorporated communities

 Adrian
 Alvada
 Amsden
 Angus
 Berwick
 Caroline
 Carrothers
 Cooper
 Cromers
 Fireside
 Frenchtown
 Iler
 Lowell
 Maple Grove
 Omar
 Reedtown
 Rehoboth
 Rockaway
 Saint Stephens
 Siam
 Springville
 Swander
 Watson
 West Lodi

Places of interest
 Seneca Caverns

Natural history
Before widespread settlement, the area of Seneca County was for the most part woodland. Besides the fringe of the Great Black Swamp in the northwest, there was also an extensive area of marshland in the Bloomville area as well as smaller patches of swamp terrain which were formed due to the county's essentially level terrain. Native American inhabitants and later settlers used the region mainly for hunting fur animals, with little agriculture of note until the early 19th century.

Starting in the early-mid 19th century, the county's area was subject to wholesale deforestation. This led to massive alteration of much of the local wildlife, with grassland and farmland animals replacing the native woodland fauna. Migrant waterbirds, in ancient times commonly encountered throughout the region as they foraged in the swamps on their way south, are nowadays rare and concentrate on the few remaining waterbodies large enough to sustain them. The passenger pigeon (Ectopistes migratorius) had several roosting (and probably nesting) places in the county when it was still wooded. Removal of the forest had driven the birds away by the 1860s, foreshadowing its eventual total extinction due to large-scale logging which rendered this species unable to sustain the massive hunting pressure.

Several species of waterbirds, formerly frequently encountered during migration, are only rarely seen nowadays. These include, for example, the common loon (Gavia immer), American wigeon (Anas americana), redhead (Aythya americana), canvasback (Aythya valisneria), and several species of mergansers.

Landbirds were apparently less seriously affected; apart from the passenger pigeon, the ruffed grouse (Bonasa umbellus), wild turkey (Meleagris gallopavo), golden eagle (Aquila chrysaetos) and marsh wren (Cistothorus palustris) had essentially or completely disappeared by 1900. However, it is not known how many of the numerous species of New World warblers, most of which today only occur only as transient migrants, formerly bred in Seneca County.

The Eskimo curlew (Numenius borealis), possibly extinct today, occurred as a transient in Ohio until about 1900; to what extent it migrated through Seneca County is not well known but even if it did it is unlikely that it was often seen after deforestation had gotten underway in earnest. The extinct Carolina parakeet (Conuropsis carolinensis) – or probably individuals of the western subspecies, the Louisiana Parakeet (C. c. ludovicianus) – may have on occasion have occurred in Seneca County as a vagrant before 1862.

The only record of the long-billed murrelet (Brachyramphus perdix) in Ohio comes from Seneca County. A stray individual of this North Pacific auk was observed and photographed between November 12–18, 1996. The rare Kirtland's warbler (Setophaga kirtlandii) is again increasing in numbers and may occasionally range as far north as Seneca County.

The introduced house sparrow (Passer domesticus) is common since at least the late 19th century. The ring-necked pheasant (Phasianus colchicus), another species introduced from Europe, never seems to have become really plentiful, though it has been a breeding resident since at least 1901.

See also
 National Register of Historic Places listings in Seneca County, Ohio

References

External links

 A Centennial Biographical History of Seneca County, Ohio. Chicago: Lewis Publishing Co., 1902.
 County website

 
1824 establishments in Ohio
Populated places established in 1824